A debt collector works for a collection agency.

Debt Collector or The Debt Collector may also refer to:
The Debt Collector, 1970 novel by Stanley Morgan
"The Debt Collector", story by Maurice Levin, basis for the 1931 early sound short Gaunt with Ralph Lewis
The Debt Collector (1999 film), a thriller written and directed by Anthony Neilson
"The Debt Collector", a song by Blur from the album Parklife, 1994
"Debt Collector", a song by Rose's Pawn Shop from  Dancing On the Gallows, 2010
The Debt Collector, a 2018 film starring Scott Adkins